Barbora Bálintová (born December 15, 1994) is a Slovak basketball player for Arka Gdynia and the Slovak national team.

She participated at the EuroBasket Women 2017.

References

1994 births
Living people
Slovak women's basketball players
Sportspeople from Košice
Point guards